Peronospora viciae is a plant pathogen. It is a downy mildew that can infect pea plants. In Iceland it grows on wild Vicia cracca and Lathyrus species.

References

Further reading

External links

Water mould plant pathogens and diseases
Vegetable diseases
Peronosporales
Species described in 1885